Harold Aston Busher (2 August 1876 – 3 October 1954) was an English cricketer.  Smith was a right-handed batsman.  He was born at Birmingham, Warwickshire.

Busher made a single first-class appearance for Warwickshire against Gloucestershire at Edgbaston in the 1908 County Championship.  Gloucestershire made 165 in their first-innings, in response Warwickshire made 229 in their first-innings, with Busher being dismissed for 15 runs by Edward Dennett.  Gloucestershire made 328 in their second-innings, leaving Warwickshire a target of 265 to win.  Warwickshire could only manage to make 204 all out, with Busher ending the innings unbeaten on 0.  This was his only major appearance for Warwickshire.

He played for Suffolk in the 1913 and 1914 Minor Counties Championship, making six appearances.  He died at McMahons Point, New South Wales, Australia on 3 October 1954.  His brother, Sydney, also played first-class cricket.

References

External links
Harold Busher at ESPNcricinfo

1876 births
1954 deaths
Cricketers from Birmingham, West Midlands
English cricketers
Warwickshire cricketers
Suffolk cricketers
English cricketers of 1890 to 1918